Tera Patrick (born Linda Ann Hopkins; July 25, 1976) is an American former pornographic actress and model who was the Penthouse Pet of the Month for February 2000 and is an inductee of the NightMoves, AVN and XRCO Halls of Fame. She is a recipient of the Hot d'Or Award, NightMoves Award, AVN Award, XRCO Award, Venus Award, Adam Film World Guide Award, Eroticline Award, FOXE Award, FAME Award, Fanny Award, XBIZ Award, and ASACP Service Recognition Award.

Early life
Tera Patrick was born Linda Ann Hopkins and was raised near San Francisco, California. Her mother is Thai and her father is of English, Irish and Dutch descent. When she was just ten, her mother left her and she grew up with her father David Hopkins, a carefree hippie. After taking weekend classes at the Barbizon Modeling and Acting School for two years, she always loved the way she looked. At one of her first photo shoots, she was sexually assaulted by the photographer, who "was feeding [her] champagne and Valium" until she "was getting wasted". She spent two years in Tokyo, where "she became addicted to Valium and alcohol and spent her paychecks on shopping sprees". When her father learned she had become sexually active, he complained to her agency, pointing out she was underage. She was sent back to the United States, "sixteen years old and already a washed-up model". At age 18, she obtained a GED, briefly studied nursing at Boise State University, then received EMT certification from a local vocational school.

Career
Patrick has appeared in Playboy and Penthouse, where she was the "Pet of the Month" for February 2000 and was selected as "Pet of the Year" runner-up. In 2003, Patrick became the masthead publisher of Genesis.

In 2006, Patrick and her then-husband, Evan Seinfeld, launched a talent agency representing models and actors. According to a quote on the agency's website, Patrick's goal "is to help girls (and guys) in the business to be treated with respect, and realize their true potential...." Additionally, she owns a production company called "Teravision," which along with Vivid Video released its first feature, Desperate, starring Patrick and Seinfeld. In April 2006, it was announced that she would host the Exxxotica Miami convention.

In November 2006, Patrick starred in a Vivid/Teravision production titled "Tera Patrick's Fashion Underground" where she performed with Jean Val Jean and Tommy Gunn. In the same film her husband, under the name Spyder Jonez, performed with Lanny Barby. In an interview, Tera Patrick says she's OK with him doing scenes with other girls. The two made five movies for Vivid and ten for Teravision (with Seinfeld appearing under the name "Spyder Jonez"; he has also directed some features).

In an interview with the Adult Film Database in February 2007, Patrick stated she would only continue to work in front of the camera for two more years, but planned on releasing her starring adult titles over the next decade.

In April 2007, Patrick and her production company, Teravision INC, filed a lawsuit against Jenna Jameson and Playboy Enterprises (the new owners of Club Jenna) for failing to properly account for and pay royalties on money earned by Patrick's Web site clubtera.com.

In 2008, Patrick began hosting the Playboy TV erotic instructional show, School of Sex. She was also the host for 25th AVN Awards ceremony.

Patrick retired from shooting scenes in the adult industry in 2008 but continues to operate her website, production company, and pursue other business ventures. She licenses her movie catalog worldwide.

In January 2013, Patrick hosted the annual XBIZ Awards.

Appearances
 Patrick appeared and voiced herself in episode 63 of Aqua Teen Hunger Force animated series, which first aired November 19, 2006.
 Her television appearances include Chelsea Lately, Last Call with Carson Daly, The Big Idea with Donny Deutsch, MSNBC, Fox News, and Telemundo.
 Patrick was on the cover of the July 2006 American edition of FHM.
 Patrick was made into a playable character in the video game Backyard Wrestling 2.
 Patrick was also in the music video for "I Can't Move" by Everlast.
 Patrick had a cameo role in the 2007 Will Ferrell comedy Blades of Glory.
 She appeared with her then-husband, Evan Seinfeld (a.k.a. Spyder Jonez), on the E! Channel's True Hollywood Story Rock Star Wives.
 Patrick hosted the 2007 Spike channel Guys Choice awards.
 In 2008, Patrick appeared as herself in four episodes of the WE network's reality series Secret Lives of Women.
 Patrick was involved in promotion for the 2008 video game Saints Row 2, and also gave her own voice in its first episodic expansion pack Ultor Exposed.
 In 2011, Complex magazine ranked her at #2 in their list of "The Top 50 Hottest Asian Porn Stars of All Time." 
 In 2012, Patrick appeared in the tenth episode of season one of Showtime series Girls of Sunset Place.
 In 2014, Patrick appeared in two mainstream movie productions. In the Dave Foley and Andy Dick comedy Live Nude Girls, she was cast along with fellow adult industry performers Bree Olsen and Asa Akira. Patrick also appears in the horror movie Angel of Darkness: The Legend of Lilith
 In August 2014, Patrick announced hosting an hour-long weekly radio show on Vivid radio on the Sirius/XM network.
  In May 2018, she appeared in Time magazine as a model in artist Nika Nesgoda's 2002 photographic series, Virgin, portraying the Virgin Mary along with Stormy Daniels and other adult film actresses.

Overseas career
Tera Patrick starred in an Indonesian mainstream horror film Rintihan Kuntilanak Perawan (Moaning of Virgin Ghost), which was presented countrywide from October 14, 2010, through November 16, 2010.

Book
Patrick's memoir, Sinner Takes All, co-written by journalist and author Carrie Borzillo, was published by Penguin imprint Gotham Books on January 5, 2010. The book chronicles Patrick's path to stardom, along with various other life experiences she had along the way. During the writing process, which she describes as "cathartic", Patrick discusses how she and her mother repaired their relationship, and how she addressed problems within her relationship with her former husband, Evan Seinfeld. Patrick commented, "I wanted the book to end happily. I knew there were problems with our marriage obviously, and the decision to leave him came about quite suddenly."

Personal life

After a three-year relationship, Patrick married musician and fellow porn actor Evan Seinfeld in a small ceremony in Las Vegas on January 9, 2004, where they were attending the 2004 AVN Awards show. On September 30, 2009, the couple announced  that they were ending their marriage. Tera remains sole owner of her production company, TeraVision Inc.

Patrick gave birth to a baby girl on February 25, 2012. The father is Hollywood special effects artist Tony Acosta, known for his work on 300, Dawn of the Dead and Man of Steel.

In an interview with Holly Randall on September 6, 2018, Patrick stated that she moved to live in Italy with her daughter, where she married an Italian defense attorney. She first came to the country in 2015 after getting an offer to do feature dance shows with a company there. After returning home to the United States when her job was finished, she eventually decided to move back.

Awards and honors

References

External links 

 
 
 
 
 2007 FAME Awards hosting bio
 Tera Patrick facts

1976 births
20th-century American actresses
21st-century American actresses
21st-century American women writers
American bloggers
American female adult models
American pornographic film actresses
American people of English descent
American people of Irish descent
American people of Dutch descent
American women in business
Boise State University alumni
Living people
21st-century American memoirists
Penthouse Pets
People from Great Falls, Montana
Pornographic film actors from Montana
American women memoirists
American women bloggers
American people of Thai descent
American expatriates in Italy